The 104th Cavalry Regiment is a Regiment of the United States Army first established in 1921. Troop A, 1st Squadron is one of several National Guard units with colonial roots and campaign credit for the War of 1812.

History
The 104th Cavalry Regiment wasn't actually raised until 1921 although some of its subordinate troops can trace their lineage  back to the Revolutionary War & War of 1812. For example, Troop A, 1st Squadron, is also known as the First Troop Philadelphia City Cavalry, the oldest mounted unit in the United States Army.  Troop B, 1st Squadron, is also known as the "State Fencibles" while Troop C, 1st Squadron, is also known as the "Governor's Troop."

The 104th Cavalry has gone through many configurations, its elements serving as the 1st Pennsylvania Cavalry and the 8th Pennsylvania Infantry on Puerto Rico during the Spanish–American War.  

On 6 July 1916, subordinate units of the regiment were mustered into Federal service for the Mexican border and stationed at El Paso, TX. The unit was mustered out on 22 January 1917.

On 15 July 1917, the regiment was drafted and mustered into Federal service for World War I as the 103d Headquarters Troop, 28th Division; and on 9 December 1917, as 103d Trench Mortar Battery, 53d Field Artillery, 28th Division. It served in both France and Belgium and was mustered out on 12 April 1919, returning to state service with its headquarters at Harrisburg.

The 104th Cavalry Regiment was formed as a unit of the Pennsylvania National Guard on 1 June 1921 via conversion of the 8th Infantry Regiment of the Pennsylvania National Guard. The regiment eventually commanded three squadrons located at Tyrone, Carlisle, and Harrisburg, and was subordinated to the 21st Cavalry Division. The regiment confronted striking coal miners from July through September 1922 at Ebensburg and Cokeburg. The 104th Cavalry provided relief assistance during floods in 1936. The regiment was relieved from the 21st Cavalry Division and assigned to the 22nd Cavalry Division in January 1939. The regiment was re-titled the 104th Cav. Regt. (Horse and Mecz) on 23 September 1940 and was relieved from assignment to the 22nd Division the following month. On 17 February 1941, the regiment was inducted into federal service. After transfer to Salem, Oregon, the units of the regiment were retitled in this manner:
 Headquarters and Headquarters Troop became HHT, 104th Cavalry Group (Mechanized)
 1st Squadron became the 104th Cavalry Reconnaissance Squadron (Mechanized)
 2nd Squadron became the 119th Cavalry Reconnaissance Squadron (Mechanized)

The 104th Cavalry Group was not sent overseas.  The group headquarters and the 119th C.R.S. were inactivated on 15 August 1944 at Camp Gruber, Oklahoma.  The 104th C.R.S. was subordinated to the 115th Cavalry Group (Mechanized) and served in combat with the VI Corps in Germany in 1945. The 104th C.R.S. returned to the U.S. and was inactivated at Camp Miles Standish, Massachusetts, on 22 October 1945.

On 25 August 1952, the regiment was redesignated the 104th Armored Cavalry Regiment; on 1 June 1959, it was redesignated as the 1st Reconnaissance Squadron, 103rd Armor; on 1 April 1963, the 1st Reconnaissance Squadron, 223rd Cavalry; and finally, on 1 1 April 1975, as the 1st Squadron, 104th Cavalry, headquartered in Philadelphia, PA. 

In 1980, elements of the 104th Cavalry were used as extras in the George C. Scott film Taps (film). 

On 28 May 2002, elements of the 1st Squadron, 104th Cavalry Regiment were mustered into Federal service as Task Force Saber. TF Saber deployed to Bosnia Herzegovina as a part of SFOR 12 for a NATO peacekeeping mission earning the Governor's Unit Citation (Permeant Orders 97-2 dated 25 October 2006).

On 4 January 2005, Troop B, 1st Squadron, 104th Cavalry, augmented with platoons from Troops A and C, and teams from the 104th Infantry Detachment (Long Range Surveillance) were mustered into federal service as part of the 2d Brigade Combat Team, 28th Infantry Division. The HBCT was responsible for its own battle space as part of Ramadi under U.S. military occupation from July 2005 to July 2006 attached to the 2d Marine Division and then the 1st Marine Expeditionary Force, earning the Navy Unit Commendation twice (DA Memorandums AHRC-PDP-A, dated 20 July 2009 and 5 March 2010).  

In 2003, the 2d Squadron was reformed and the regiment's current configuration in the Pennsylvania Army National Guard is in two squadrons, one Armored (1st) and one Stryker (2d).  

In 2005, the 2d Squadron was awarded the Governor's Unit Citation for Operation Katrina Relief (Hurricane Katrina, Louisiana)Permanent Orders 104-6.

In 2009, the 2d Squadron deployed to Taji, Iraq. With several company sized elements working and living on J.S.S.'s (Joint Security Site) with their Iraqi counterparts. The 2d Squadron was awarded the Meritorious Unit Commendation Permanent Orders 337-04.

The 1st Squadron was called upon and deployed to the Sinai Peninsula, Egypt in 2008 as part of the 51st rotation of the Multinational Force and Observers and deployed again in 2013 to the State of Kuwait in support of Operation Enduring Freedom. 

As of 2014, the 1st Squadron is assigned to the 55th Heavy Brigade Combat Team, 28th Infantry Division. The 2d Squadron is assigned to the 56th Stryker Brigade Combat Team, 28th Infantry Division, Pennsylvania Army National Guard. As with most other Army units, there is no regimental headquarters, although a ceremonial regimental dining in is held annually in the Philadelphia area.

After a long break in the deployment rotation, the 1st Squadron was then called up again and deployed to the Sinai Peninsula, Egypt in 2021 as part as the 69th rotation of the Multinational Force and Observers. The Squadron deployed with all of its troops, HHT, Alpha, Bravo, and Charlie.  

Composer Douglas Moore wrote the "104th Cavalry Regiment March" in 1924 in honor of the regiment.

Distinctive Unit Insignia
 Description
A circular device,  inches (3.18 cm) in diameter, with the Regimental motto "Over, Under or Through," lettered around the outer circumference. Diagonal bar running from 10 o'clock to 4 o'clock, with horse's head superimposed thereon and filling the center of the circle. Red keystone between horse's head and 8 o'clock, Maltese cross between horse's head and 1 o'clock. Outer circumference and horse's head in yellow; motto and crossbar in blue; keystone in red; and Maltese cross in black. 
 Symbolism
The shield is of yellow – the Cavalry color; the blue bend is for service as Infantry; the black Maltese cross is for the service in Puerto Rico; the red keystone is the Divisional insignia of the Twenty Eighth Division in which elements of the First Cavalry and the Eighth Infantry served. 
 Background
The distinctive unit insignia was originally approved for the 104th Cavalry, Pennsylvania National Guard on 24 January 1924. It was redesignated for the 104th Cavalry Reconnaissance Squadron (Mechanized) on 8 June 1944. It was redesignated for the 104th Armored Cavalry Regiment on 25 August 1952. The insignia was redesignated for 104th Cavalry Regiment on 9 May 1989. It was amended to correct the previous designation dates and the symbolism on 17 October 2003.

Coat Of Arms

Blazon
 Shield
Or on a bend Azure five mullets of the first between in sinister chief a Maltese cross Sable and in dexter base a keystone Gules. 
 Crest
That for the regiments and separate battalions of the Pennsylvania Army National Guard: On a torse of the colors Or and Azure a lion rampant guardant Proper, holding in dexter paw a naked scimitar Argent hilted Or and in sinister an escutcheon on a fess Sable three plates. 
Motto OVER, UNDER OR THROUGH.
Symbolism
 Shield
The shield is of yellow – the Cavalry color; the blue bend is for service as Infantry; the black Maltese cross is for the service in Puerto Rico; the red keystone is the Divisional insignia of the Twenty Eighth Division in which elements of the First Cavalry and the Eighth Infantry served, and the five stars represent the five major operations of the Twenty Eight Division. 
 Crest
The crest is that of the Pennsylvania Army National Guard. 
 Background
The coat of arms was originally approved for the 104th Cavalry Regiment, Pennsylvania National Guard on 3 January 1924. It was redesignated for the 104th Cavalry Reconnaissance Squadron (Mechanized) on 6 June 1944. It was redesignated for the 104th Armored Cavalry Regiment on 25 August 1952. The coat of arms was redesignated for the 104th Cavalry Regiment on 9 May 1989.

Current configuration
 1st Squadron, 104th Cavalry Regiment
 2d Squadron, 104th Cavalry Regiment

See also
 List of armored and cavalry regiments of the United States Army

References

 Clay, Steven E., U.S. Army Order of Battle 1919-1941 (Vol. 2), Fort Leavenworth: Combat Studies Institute Press, 2010.
 Stanton, Shelby, U.S. Army Order of Battle in World War II, New York: Galahad Books, 1994.
 Historical register and dictionary of the United States Army, from ..., Volume 1 By Francis Bernard Heitman 
 Encyclopedia of United States Army insignia and uniforms By William K. Emerson (page 51).

External links
 https://web.archive.org/web/20110513005759/http://www.history.army.mil/html/forcestruc/lineages/branches/ar/default.htm
 https://web.archive.org/web/20110513005804/http://www.history.army.mil/html/forcestruc/lineages/branches/cav/default.htm
 https://web.archive.org/web/20101219082219/http://pngmilitarymuseum.org/annual_histories/28th_ID/HHT%20104th%20CAV2008%5B1%5D%20Unit%20history%20template.pdf

104
Military units and formations established in 1921